The Ghana Police Service is the main law enforcement agency in Ghana. It is organized at national level and has a unitary command under the Inspector General of Police (IGP). Although there are many regional and divisional commands, they all report to the National Headquarters in Accra.

History
Policing in early Ghana (then the Gold Coast) was originally organized by traditional authorities led by local kings or chiefs. This they did by employing unpaid messengers to carry out executive and judicial functions in their respective communities. In the metropolitan areas of Ashanti, several police forces were responsible for maintaining law and order. In Kumasi, there existed a uniformed police, who were distinguished by their long hair. The  or road wardens served as the highway police; checking the movement of traders and strangers on all Ashanti roads. They were also responsible for scouting and were charged with the collection of tolls from traders. Professional policing was introduced by the British Colonial authorities in 1831. The colonial administrator at the time, Captain George Maclean, Governor of the Gold Coast, recruited 129 men to patrol the trade routes between Ashanti Empire and the coast and to protect colonial merchants and officials around the castle.

In 1844, these troops were taken over by the British colonial authorities and became the "Gold Coast Militia and Police". In 1871 when the British assumed full sovereignty over the Gold Coast, the 90 men in the police force was reinforced with a further 400 men. All the commissioned officers at the time were British. The force became the "Gold Coast Constabulary" in 1876.

The Police Ordinance, passed in 1894, gave legal backing to the formation of a civilian police force in the colony. By 1902, the police had been divided into General, Escort, Mines and Railway Police and this was legalised by the Police [Amendment] Ordinance of 1904. A Marine Police unit was formed in 1906. This was replaced by the Customs, Excise and Preventive Service in 1942. The Criminal Investigation Department was established in 1922.

Following the riots of 1948 led by the Big Six, the Special Branch and the Police Reserves Unit was formed for riot control and prevent destabilization of the government. The Special Branch was to gather intelligence though it was also used to hound political opponents. The Reserves unit was known to deal harshly with street demonstrators and protestors.

The Wireless and Communications Unit was opened in June 1950. A women's branch was established with 12 officers in 1952. The Police College was opened in 1959. Prior to this, all officers were trained in the United Kingdom. Ghana has now sought to secure advanced training programs from World Police Academy Canada and the Royal Ulster Constabulary Ireland.

The first Ghanaian to head the Ghana Police was E. R. T. Madjitey, who was appointed on October 9, 1958.

Organization

National
The Inspector General of Police (IGP) is the head of the Ghana Police service. He is aided by 2 Deputy IGPs responsible for administration and operations. The police structure is organized at national level into ten schedules each headed by a Commissioner. The schedules are:

Operations
 Criminal Investigation Department (CID)
Legal and Special Duties
 Logistics and Support Services
 Operations
 Police Intelligence and Professional Standards Bureau

Administration
Human Resource Development
 Welfare
 Research, Planning and Information Communication and Technology
 Strategic Direction and Monitoring
 Finance

Regions
There are 13 regions under the police service. Each of them is headed by a Regional Commander with a rank of Assistant Commissioner. There are the ten geographical regions, Ashanti, Brong Ahafo, Central, Eastern, Greater Accra, Northern, Upper East, Upper West, Volta and Western regions. The last three regions are Tema, Railway and Ports, and finally National Headquarters.

Divisions
Each region with the exception of the National Headquarters is divided into divisions. There are 51 divisions nationwide. These are further subdivided into 179 Districts and 651 Stations across the country.

Ranks
The ranks of Ghanaian police officers are loosely based on that of the British and other Commonwealth police although there are variations. The posts and ranks within the police service are broadly divided into those of superior officers and subordinate officers or other ranks.

Superior officers
Inspector General of Police( A star surrounded by laurel leaves and surmounted by two eagles facing each other and one star). 
Deputy Inspector General ( A star surrounded by laurel leaves and surmounted by two eagles facing each other and two star).
Commissioner ( A star surrounded by laurel leaves and surmounted by two stars).
Deputy Commissioner( A star surrounded by laurel leaves and surmounted by one star)
Assistant Commissioner( A star surrounded by laurel leaves)
Chief Superintendent (Two eagles facing each other and surmounted by one star).
Superintendent (Two eagles facing each other).
Deputy Superintendent (Three stars).
Assistant Superintendent (Two stars).

Subordinate Police Officers
Chief Inspector
Inspector
Sergeant
Corporal
Lance Corporal
Constable

See also
Bureau of National Investigations (BNI) (formerly Special Branch)
Inspector General of Police (IGP)
Border Guard Units
Crime in Ghana

References

External links
Ghana Police Service website